The Rolls-Royce/MAN Turbo RB.153 was a high-performance  dry thrust turbofan engine developed jointly by Rolls-Royce Limited and MAN Turbo. Developed for the German EWR VJ 101D interceptor with a German-developed thrust-deflector system. The engine was also proposed for a number of other military VTOL projects including the Hawker P.1157 and Dornier Do 31. A commercial-version of the engine was also considered for the Messerschmitt Me P.160 airliner. The VJ101D project was cancelled and the engine never flew, being retained as a test bed.

Applications
EWR VJ 101D cancelled.

Specifications

See also

References
Notes

Turbofan and turbojet engines: database handbook p395 (2007) By Élodie Roux

1960s turbofan engines
RB153